Scoparia halopis is a moth in the family Crambidae. It was described by Edward Meyrick in 1909. It is endemic to New Zealand, where it has been recorded as far south as the Auckland Islands.

New Zealand lepidopterist Brian Patrick notes that "when I was young growing up in Invercargill, I reared an adult from larvae found in soil - so probably a sod webworm by lifestyle." According to Brian, this species is "common and widely distributed from sub-Antarctic northwards in both natural and suburban settings" in New Zealand.

References

Moths described in 1909
Scorparia
Moths of New Zealand
Endemic fauna of New Zealand
Taxa named by Edward Meyrick
Endemic moths of New Zealand